McCalls Ferry Farm, also known as the Robert and Matthew McCall Farm, Atkins-Trout Farm, and Kilgore Farm, is a historic farm and national historic district located at Lower Chanceford Township in York County, Pennsylvania. The district includes six contributing buildings and two contributing sites.  The buildings are the farmhouse (c. 1790), Sweitzer barn (c. 1799), frame corn barn (c. 1799), tobacco barn (c. 1875), milk house (c. 1910), and chicken house (c. 1950). The farmhouse is a banked Pennsylvania German vernacular dwelling built of stone and coated in stucco. It measures 40 feet wide and 30 feet deep, and has a slate covered gable roof. The sites are the stone foundation of a scale house (c. 1875) and the ruins of a small dwelling (c. 1900).

It was listed on the National Register of Historic Places in 2000.

References 

Farms on the National Register of Historic Places in Pennsylvania
Historic districts on the National Register of Historic Places in Pennsylvania
Buildings and structures in York County, Pennsylvania
Houses in York County, Pennsylvania
National Register of Historic Places in York County, Pennsylvania